The Songye people, sometimes written Songe, are a Bantu ethnic group from the central Democratic Republic of the Congo. They inhabit a vast territory between the Sankuru and Lubilash rivers in the west and the Lualaba River in the east. Many Songye villages can be found in present-day East Kasai province, parts of Katanga and Kivu Province. The people of Songye are divided into thirty-four conglomerate societies; each society is led by a single chief with a Judiciary Council of elders and nobles (bilolo). Smaller kingdoms east of the Lomami River refer to themselves as Songye, other kingdoms in the west, refer to themselves as Kalebwe, Eki, Ilande, Bala, Chofwe, Sanga and Tempa. As a society, the people of Songye are mainly known as a farming community; they do, however, take part in hunting and trading with other neighboring communities.

Origins and ancestors 
The origin of the Songye begins when its founding ancestors Chimbale and Kongolo established the Kingdom of Luba. Chimbale and Kongolo played an important role in establishing the foundation of Luba's political empire. After suffering from political dissension, the ancestors of Songye migrated out of the Luba Empire. The Songye honor their ancestors and cultural heroes through a series of different practices and occasions. In Songye culture, it is believed that the chiefs are sacred heirs of their ancestors and of the founding cultural hero. Hunting was an occupation associated with cultural heroes: Chiefs would organize hunting of animals to showcase the power that was imbued in him by the cultural hero he was honoring. Blacksmithing was another craft that was associated with their heroes. Their smiths were reputed for their production of arms; their axes were used by Luba, and some were found in the ruins of Khami in Rhodesia.

Religion 
The people of Songye believe in a supreme being Ele-ife, however, he is not praised as much as ancestral spirits. Ancestral worship is very prevalent within Songye culture, it is believed that the spirit of their ancestors is more accessible to them due to their shared experience of being alive. As a result of this, these spirits have a connection to both the land of the living and the dead and are able to enact their will on the community.

Secret Society: Bwadi bra Kifwebe 

Bwadi bra Kifwebe is a secret society of masked men. In the community, these men were known for their use of magic (Buki or Buchi) and sorcery (Masende). Buki and Masende magic differ from witchcraft; these types of magic are inherited or obtained either by will or unconsciously. Witchcraft, in contrast, can be obtained through initiation and at the appropriate use of magical ingredients. In order to become a member of the Bwadi bra Kifwebe, all applicants must undergo an initiation process. During this process, initiates must learn and identify a secret esoteric language. They must undergo a radical and violent experience in order to become less fearful of the unknown and learn their roles within the subject to Bwadi bra Kifwebe. Some of the Bwadi bra Kifwebe help regulate and maintain political order and balance between the chief and his communities. The Bwadi bra Kifwebe maintain balance within the community by conducting masquerades, rituals and rites such as initiation rituals, circumcisions and funerals.

Masquerades 
The Bwadi bra Kifwebe maintain balance within the community by conducting masquerades.

Dancers  
The overall appearance of a masquerader varies on the dancer, the type of ceremony they're performing in, and spirit being evoked. Normally Masqueraders have a wooden mask and are covered head to toe in flowing black raffia fibers made from the bark or roots of trees. Their arms, bodies and legs are covered with raffia netting, with goat skins fastened around their waist. The dancers are male and the complexity of their costume varies on their status within the community. When the dancer is wearing a male mask his movements are aggressive and unstable, however when a dancer wears a female mask his movements are gentle and controlled. The dances of the kifwebe dancers are meant to encourage social conformity within the community showing its people how one should behave in their society.

Mask

Cosmology of a mask 
There are two different types of kifwebe masks. The kifwebe masks come in various designs and reference different aspects of nature, culture and cosmology. Kifwebe masks symbolized the spirits of the dead, the underworld and the struggle between good and evil (Community vs antisocial practices and witchcraft), each element of the mask symbolized these aspects in a certain way. the intertwining of the rhythmic colors of red, black and white was meant to symbolize the struggle between good (white) and evil (black and red), the combination of these colors embody the positive and dangerous force held with in the mask. The ruggedness of the mask itself symbolizes the underworld and the spirits escape from it.

Male and Female kifwebe masks 
Male Kifwebe masks were mainly used for initiation ceremonies, circumcision, and the  enthronement and funerals of the supreme chief. The face of a typical Kifwebe masks is covered with linear incisions, a square protruding mouth and a linear nose set between globular pierced eyes. Male masks typical have a centered crest on the top of the masks and its size varies on the status of the dancer wearing it, elder dances within the Bwadi bra Kifwebe have larger centered crest compared to others. Female Kifwebe masks was typically used for public ceremonies and reproduction rituals. women within the songye community viewed woman as the bearer of children and good fortune. To them, women representation of  continuation of life and cultural tradition. The features of the female kifwebe mask was meant to portray these ideas.  Typically they share similar characteristics as the male mask however it facial features are more gentle and rounded evoking the tenderness of a mother as well as the power to protect and support her children. The structure of the face is longed, the mask itself is covered in white paint or Kaolin.

Mankishi and the spirits within 

Mankishi are spirits of the dead that can influence the world of men. These spirits can be malevolent spirits causing infertility, bad harvests and sickness or benevolent spirits bringing good health and prosperity in the hunt and field. The Songye believe that spirits can be reborn; benevolent spirits are believed to be reborn by creating a mamkishi power figure, while malevolent spirits (bikudi) are not reborn and are forced to roam the earth for eternity. Not all spirits who are unable to be reborn as a Mankishi are wandering spirits, spirits who are not reborn yet are knowledgeable on their power and knowledge of patrilineage founders, heroic leaders, and lineage chiefs and dignitaries become guardians of the lineage and provide general protection. Mankishi conforms to a certain magico-social standard within the Songye community. Songye figures serves as a protectors of the community, encourages fertility and protects families from evil spirits and practitioners. Nganga or magical practitioners are responsible for commissioning these figures, they decide the dimensions of the figure, sex morphological aspects and type of wood used for the figure.

These Sculptures comes various forms and serves different purposes, Usually Mankishi are depicted as a large stylized sculptures of a standing on a base. In profile, the repetition of strong diagonals in the coiffure, beard forearm and feet are forceful and aesthetically pleasing. The horizontal shoulders arm and legs helps gives the figure a sense of energy and movement. The Stance is meant to signify the mankishi's alertness and readiness to carry out his purpose whether it is protecting its owner from evil spirits or witches and sorcerers. Its head is usually elongated with sharp facial feature such as the eyes, chin, and rectangular nose. Its torso is also elongated yet the center of abdomen is hallowed along with the top of the head so that the Bijimba, a magical substance created by the Nganga, can house the sculpture and bring spiritual power to it. Female figures exist however they are not as common as male Mankishi. Female Mankishi are smaller and they are usually for personal usage. Like its male counterpart, the female Nkishi has a cavity in the abdomen and head to house the Bijimba. The figure itself usually shows signs of scarification on its face and above its face. The legs of the figure are posed in an unusual way and appears to be unfinished, this may suggests that it was covered by sacred objects and was not meant to be shown . When the Mankishi is being used the nganga places shells, horns, animal skins, nails or studs and other spiritual objects outside of the figure to enhance its power and influence 38. The housing of the Mankishi varies on its size, purpose and importance, larger Mankishi that are created to guard and protect a family or village is housed in a family shine. Smaller more personal Mankishi are usually kept by the owner and are portable.

See also
 Zappo Zap

References

Further reading 

 Merriam, Alan P. 1974. An African World: The Basongye Village of Lupupa Ngye. Indiana University Press.
  Phillips, T. (ed.). 1996. Africa: Art of a Continent. Prestel.
 Alain-Michel Boyer, « Les Songyés » in Les Arts d'Afrique, Hazan, Paris, 2008, p. 364-365 .
 François Neyt, Songye : la redoutable statuaire songye d'Afrique centrale, Fonds Mercator ; 5 continents, 2004, 398 p. .
 Hughes Dubois, Viviane Baeke et Anne-Marie Bouttiaux, Le sensible et la force : photographies de Hughes Dubois et sculptures songye, Musée royal de l'Afrique centrale, Tervuren (Belgique), 2004, 88 p. .
 Jean-Marie Lusuna Kazadi, Les Songye de la RDC : hommage à un héros : Ya'Gérard Lusuna, Éditions Aux Petits génies, 2003, 75p.
 Allen Wardwell, Three African traditions : the art of the Dogon, Fang and Songye, Bruce Museum of arts and science, Greenwich (Conn.), 1999, 47 p. .
 Thomas Turner, Batetela, Baluba, Basonge : ethnogenesis in Zaire, Cahiers d'études africaines. 33 (4) no. 132, 1993, pages 587-612. Paris
 Hildegard Klein (Ed), Leo Frobenius (1873–1938), Bassonge (Songye), Ethnographische Notizen aus den Jahren 1905 und 1906, vol. 4 [is titled:] Kenyok, Luba, Songye, Tetela, Songo, Meno/Nkutu, Stuttgart : Franz Steiner Verlag Wiesbaden, 1990, p. 87-161
 Marta Heloísa Leuba Salum, Consideraçoes sobre as madeiras que os Basonge escolheram para esculpir algumas de suas estátuas, Dédalo, 28, 1990, p. 207-226, São Paulo
 Marta Heloísa (Lisy) Leuba Salum, A grande estatuária songe do Zaire, [São Paulo] : Universidade de São Paulo, fivereiro de 1990, 2 v., x, 326 p., ill., maps, 28 cm. Thesis (M.A.) Universidade de São Paulo, 1990.
 Muepu Mibanga, Songye : livre des proverbes, Éditions Bouwa, 1988, 277 p.
 Muepu Mibanga, Jean Sohier et Johan M. Pauwels, Songye : le recueil de jurisprudence de l'Etat indépendant du Congo jusqu'à 1967, Renapi, 1987, 128 p.
 Dunja Hersak, Songye masks and figure sculpture, Ethnographica, Londres, 1985, 189 p. 
 Jean Willy Mestach, Études songye : formes et symbolique : essai d'analyse/Songye Studien : Formen und Symbolik : ein analytischer Essay/Songye studies : form and symbolism : an analytical essay, Galerie Jahn, 1985, 183 p.
 Viktor Kabamba Nkamany A Baleme, Art et culture songye : Initiation aux aspects de la culture Songye, Nkamanyland, 1983, 112 p.
 Alan P. Merriam (1923–1980), Kifwebe and other masked and unmasked societies among the Basongye, Africa-Tervuren, 24 (3) 1978, p. 57-73 [et] 24 (4) 1978, p. 89-101, Tervuren
 Roger Dechamps (+1995), L'identification anatomique des bois utilisés pour des sculptures en Afrique. V, La sculpture Songye, Africa-Tervuren, 21 (1-2) 1975, p. 27-33, Tervuren.
 Alan P. Merriam (1923–1980), Change in religion and the arts in a Zairian village, African arts, 7 (4), summer 1974, p. 46-53, 95, Los Angeles
 Alan P. Merriam (1923–1980), An African world: the Basongye village of Lupupa Ngye, Bloomington : Indiana University Press, [1974], xxiii, 347 p. ill. 24 cm.
 Alan P. Merriam (1923–1980), The Bala musician, In: Warren d'Azevedo, ed. Traditional artist in African society, Bloomington, Indiana University Press, 1973, p. 250-281

External links
 Songye Information from the University of Iowa
For spirits and kings: African art from the Paul and Ruth Tishman collection, an exhibition catalog from The Metropolitan Museum of Art Libraries (fully available online as PDF), which contains material on the Songye people

Ethnic groups in the Democratic Republic of the Congo